Flávio Hugo Venturini (born July 23, 1949) is a Brazilian singer and songwriter.

Biography 
Venturini took an early interest in music at the age of three. When he was fifteen he began his musical training. His first musical instrument was the accordion. After his father presented him with a piano, he started his studies at the Fundação
de Educação Artística in Belo Horizonte, where he studied musical perception and piano.

Venturini was revealed in the 1970s by the musical movement Clube da Esquina, together with Milton Nascimento, Lô Borges, Beto Guedes, among others. Between 1974 and 1976, he was a member of the musical group O Terço. In 1979 found the group 14 Bis, by which he made success between 1980 and 1989, when he left the group to begin a solo career.

Among his main successes, as a composer or performer, are "Todo Azul do Mar", "Linda Juventude", "Planeta Sonho", "Nascente", "Nuvens", "Espanhola" (partnership with Guarabyra, a member of the duo Sá & Guarabyra) and "Mais Uma Vez" (with Renato Russo, the formal founder and leader of Legião Urbana); originally recorded and performed by 14 Bis in 1987 and re-released in 2003.

Notable songs from Venturini's solo career include "Princesa", "Besame", "Nascente", and "Céu de Santo Amaro".

Discography

Clube da Esquina 
 1978 - Clube da Esquina 2

O Terço 
 1974 - Criaturas da Noite (Underground/Copacabana)
 1975 - Casa Encantada (Underground/Copacabana)
 2007 - O Terço Ao Vivo (Som Livre)

14 Bis 
 1979 - 14 Bis
 1980 - 14 Bis II
 1981 - Espelho das Águas
 1982 - Além Paraíso 1983 - A Idade da Luz 1985 - A Nave Vai 1987 - Sete 1987 - Ao Vivo Solo 
 1982 - Nascente (EMI/Odeon)
 1984 - O Andarilho (EMI/Odeon)
 1990 - Cidade Veloz (Chorus/Som Livre)
 1992 - Ao Vivo (Som Livre)
 1994 - Noites com Sol (Velas)
 1996 - Beija-Flor (Velas)
 1997 - Flavio Venturini e Toninho Horta no Circo Voador (Dubas)
 1998 - Trem Azul (EMI/Odeon)
 1999 - Linda Juventude (Som Livre) (CD/DVD released)
 2003 - Porque Não Tinhamos Bicicletas (Trilhos)
 2005 - Luz Viva (Trilhos)
 2005 - Aquela Estrela (Trilhos)
 2006 - Canção Sem Fim (Trilhos)
 2009 - Não Se Apague Esta Noite (Trilhos/Som Livre) (CD/DVD released)
 2013 - Venturini''

References

External links 
 
 
 Flávio Venturini at Dicionário Cravo Albin da Música Popular Brasileira 

1949 births
Living people
People from Belo Horizonte
20th-century Brazilian male singers
20th-century Brazilian singers
Brazilian pianists
Brazilian keyboardists
Male pianists
21st-century pianists
21st-century Brazilian male singers
21st-century Brazilian singers